The Lan Na Kingdom ("Kingdom of a Million Rice Fields"; ,), also known as Lannathai, and most commonly called Lanna or Lanna Kingdom, was an Indianized state centered in present-day Northern Thailand from the 13th to 18th centuries.

The cultural development of the Northern Thai people had begun long before as successive kingdoms preceded Lan Na. As a continuation of the kingdom of Ngoenyang, Lan Na emerged strong enough in the 15th century to rival the Ayutthaya Kingdom, with whom wars were fought. However, the Lan Na Kingdom was weakened and became a tributary state of the Taungoo Dynasty in 1558. Lan Na was ruled by successive vassal kings, though some enjoyed autonomy. The Burmese rule gradually withdrew but then resumed as the new Konbaung Dynasty expanded its influence. In 1775, Lan Na chiefs left the Burmese control to join Siam, leading to the Burmese–Siamese War (1775–76).

Following the retreat of the Burmese force, Burmese control over Lan Na came to the end. Siam, under King Taksin of the Thonburi Kingdom, gained control of Lan Na in 1776. From then on, Lan Na became a tributary state of Siam under the succeeding Chakri Dynasty.

Throughout the latter half of the 1800s, the Siamese state dismantled Lan Na independence, absorbing it into the emerging Siamese nation-state. Beginning in 1874, the Siamese state reorganized Lan Na Kingdom as Monthon Phayap, brought under the direct control of Siam. The Lan Na Kingdom effectively became centrally administered from through the Siamese thesaphiban governance system instituted in 1899. By 1909, Lan Na Kingdom no longer existed formally as an independent state, as Siam finalized the demarcation of its borders with the British and French.

Names
The Lan Na kingdom is known by a number of exonyms in neighboring languages. In Burmese chronicles and sources, it is called Zinme Pyi, Zinme being a Burmese language transcription of Chiang Mai; or Yun Pyi, Yun being the Burmese term for the Northern Thai people. In the Laotian language, it is known as Anachak Lan Na.

The Pali chronicles refer to the kingdom as Yonaraṭṭha (Kingdom of the Yun) or Bingaraṭṭha (Kingdom of the Mae Ping). In the Chinese History of the Yuan, it is called Babai Xifu (Pa-pai-si-fu), first attested in 1292.

History

Early establishment

Mangrai, the 25th king of Ngoenyang (modern Chiang Saen) of the Lavachakkaraj dynasty, whose mother was a princess of a kingdom in Sipsongpanna ("the twelve nations"), centralized the mueangs of Ngoenyang into a unified kingdom or mandala and allied with the neighboring Phayao Kingdom. In 1262, Mangrai moved the capital from Ngoenyang to the newly founded Chiang Rai — naming the city after himself. Mangrai then expanded to the south and subjugated the Mon kingdom of Hariphunchai (centered on modern Lamphun) in 1281. Mangrai moved the capital several times. Leaving Lamphun due to heavy flooding, he drifted until settling at and building Wiang Kum Kam in 1286/7, staying there until 1292 at which time he relocated to what would become Chiang Mai. He founded Chiang Mai in 1296, expanding it to become the capital of Lan Na. Claimed territories of Mangrai's Lan Na include modern northern Thailand provinces (with exception of Phrae — which was under vassalhood of Sukhothai— and Phayao and Nan), Kengtung, Mong Nai, and Chiang Hung (modern Jinghong in Yunnan). He also reduced to vassaldom and received tribute from areas of modern Northern Vietnam, principally in the Black and Red river valleys, and most of Northern Laos, plus the Sipsongpanna of Yunnan where his mother originated.

Disunity and prosperity

Around 1311, Mangrai died and was succeeded by his second son Grama, or Jayasangrama (Khun Hham). He soon retired to Chiangrai and appointed his son Saen Phu as the Uparaja (Viceroy) of Chiangmai. Mangrai's youngest son, ruler of Mong Nai returned to claim the throne, occupying Haripunjaya. Saen Phu and his brother Nam Thuem fled to their father in Chiangrai. Nam Tuam succeeded in driving out their uncle, restoring Saen Phu onto the throne in 1322 or 1324. Saen Phu founded the city of Chiang Saen in 1325 or 1328, before he died in 1334. His son Kham Fu replaced him but reigned only few years, before he was succeeded by his son Pha Yu, who restored the capital to Chiang Mai again. There he fortified the city and built Wat Phra Singh.

Theravada Buddhism prospered in Lan Na during the reign of religious Kue Na who established the dhatu of Doi Suthep in 1386. Kue Na promoted the Lankawongse sect and invited monks from Sukhothai to replace the existing Mon Theravada that Lan Na inherited from Haripunchai.

Lan Na enjoyed peace under Saenmuengma (which means ten thousand cities arrive — to pay tribute). The only disturbing event was the failed rebellion by his uncle Prince Maha Prommatat. Maha Prommatat requested aid from Ayutthaya. Borommaracha I of Ayutthaya sent his troops to invade Lan Na but was repelled. This was the first armed conflict between the two kingdoms. Lan Na faced invasions from the newly established Ming Dynasty in the reign of Sam Fang Kaen.

Expansions under Tilokkarat

The Lan Na kingdom was strongest under Tilokkarat (1441–1487). Tilokkarat seized the throne from his father Sam Fang Kaen in 1441. Tilokkarat's brother, Thau Choi, rebelled to reclaim the throne for his father and sought Ayutthayan support. Borommaracha II sent his troops to Lan Na in 1442 but was repelled and the rebellion was suppressed. Tilokkarat conquered the neighboring Kingdom of Payao in 1456.

To the south, the emerging Kingdom of Ayutthaya was also growing powerful. Relations between the two kingdoms had worsened since the Ayutthayan support of Thau Choi's rebellion. In 1451, Yutthitthira, a Sukhothai royal who had conflicts with Trailokanat of Ayutthaya, gave himself to Tilokkarat. Yuttitthira urged Trilokanat to invade Pitsanulok which he had claims on, igniting the Ayutthaya-Lan Na War over the Upper Chao Phraya valley (i.e. the Kingdom of Sukhothai). In 1460, the governor of Chaliang surrendered to Tilokkarat. Trailokanat then used a new strategy and concentrated on the wars with Lan Na by moving the capital to Pitsanulok. Lan Na suffered setbacks and Tilokkarat eventually sued for peace in 1475.

Tilokkarat was also a strong patron of Theravada Buddhism. In 1477, the Buddhist Council to recompile the Tripitaka was held near Chiang Mai. Tilokkarat also built and rehabilitated many notable temples. Tilokkarat then expanded west to the Shan States of Laihka, Hsipaw, Mong Nai, and Yawnghwe.

Decline
After Tilokkarat, Lan Na was then subjected to old-style princely struggles that prevented the kingdom from defending itself against powerful growing neighbors. The Shans then broke themselves free of Lan Na control that Tilokkarat had established. The last strong ruler was Paya Kaew who was the great-grandson of Tilokkarat. In 1507, Kaew invaded Ayutthaya but was repelled — only to be invaded in turn in 1513 by Ramathibodi II and Lampang was sacked. In 1523, a dynastic struggle occurred in Kengtung State. One faction sought Lan Na support while another faction went for Hsipaw. Kaew then sent Lan Na armies to re-exert control there but was readily defeated by Hsipaw armies. The loss was so tremendous that Lan Na never regained such dominance.

In 1538, King Ketklao, son of Kaew, was overthrown by his own son Thau Sai Kam. However, Ketklao was restored in 1543 but suffered mental illness and was executed in 1545. Ketklao's daughter, Chiraprapha, then succeeded her father as the queen regnant. As Lan Na was plundered by the dynastic struggles, both Ayutthaya and the Burmese saw this as an opportunity to overwhelm Lan Na. Chairacha of Ayutthaya invaded Lan Na in 1545, but Chiraprapha negotiated for peace. Chairacha returned next year, sacking Lampang and Lamphun, and threatened Chiangmai itself. So, Chiraprapha was forced to put her kingdom under Ayutthaya as a tributary state.

Facing pressures from the invaders, Chiraprapha decided to abdicate in 1546 and the nobility gave the throne to her nephew (son of her sister), Prince Chaiyasettha of Lan Xang. Chaiyasettha moved to Lan Na and thus Lan Na was ruled by a Laotian king. In 1547, Prince Chaiyasettha returned to Lan Xang to claim the throne and ascended as Setthathirath. Setthathirath also brought the Emerald Buddha from Chiangmai to Luang Prabang (the one that would be later taken to Bangkok by Buddha Yodfa Chulaloke). The nobles then chose Mekuti, the Shan saopha of Mong Nai whose family was related to Mangrai, to be the new king of Lan Na. It was said that, as a Shan king, Mekuti violated several Lan Na norms and beliefs.

Burmese rule
The kingdom then came to conflict over Shan states with the expansionist Burmese king Bayinnaung. Bayinnaung's forces invaded Lan Na from the north, and Mekuti surrendered on 2 April 1558. Encouraged by Setthathirath, Mekuti revolted during the Burmese–Siamese War (1563–64). But the king was captured by Burmese forces in November 1564, and sent to the-then Burmese capital of Pegu. Bayinnaung then made Wisutthithewi, a Lan Na royal, the queen regnant of Lan Na. After her death, Bayinnaung appointed one of his sons Nawrahta Minsaw (Noratra Minsosi), viceroy of Lan Na in January 1579. Burma allowed a substantial degree of autonomy for Lan Na but strictly controlled the corvée and taxation.

After Bayinnaung, his massive empire quickly unraveled. Siam successfully revolted (1584–93), after which all the vassals of Pegu went their own way by 1596–1597. Lan Na's Nawrahta Minsaw declared independence in 1596. In 1602, Nawrahta Minsaw became a tributary of King Naresuan of Siam. However, Siam's control was short-lived. The actual suzerainty effectively ended with Naresuan's death in 1605. By 1614, Siam's control over Lan Na was at most nominal. When the Burmese returned, the ruler of Lan Na, Thado Kyaw (Phra Choi), sought and received help from Lan Xang, not his nominal overlord Siam, which did not send any help. After 1614, vassal kings of Burmese descent ruled Lan Na for over one hundred years. Siam did try to take over Lan Na in 1662–1664 but failed.

By the 1720s, the Toungoo Dynasty was on its last legs. In 1727, Chiang Mai revolted because of high taxation. The resistance forces drove back the Burmese army in 1727–1728 and 1731–1732, after which Chiang Mai and Ping valley became independent. Chiang Mai became a tributary again in 1757 to the new Burmese dynasty. It revolted again in 1761 with Siamese encouragement but the rebellion was suppressed by January 1763. In the 1765, the Burmese used Lan Na as a launching pad to invade the Laotian states, and Siam itself.

End of Burmese rule
In the early 1770s, Burma was at the peak of its military power since Bayinnaung, having defeated Siam (1765–67) and China (1765–69), the Burmese army commanders and governors became "drunk with victory". This arrogant repressive behavior by the local Burmese government caused a rebellion in Lan Na. The new Burmese governor at Chiang Mai, Thado Mindin, was disrespectful to local chiefs and the people, and became extremely unpopular. One of the local chiefs, Kawila of Lampang revolted with Siamese help, and captured the city on 15 January 1775, ending the 200-year Burmese rule. Kawila was installed as the prince of Lampang and Phraya Chaban as the prince of Chiang Mai, both as vassals of Siam.

Burma tried to regain Lan Na in 1775–76, 1785–86, 1797 but failed each time. In the 1790s, Kawila consolidated his hold of Lan Na, taking over Chiang Saen. He then tried to take over Burma's Shan state of Kengtung and Sipsongpanna (1803–1808) but failed.

Nonetheless, the Kingdom of Chiang Mai, as a vassal state of Siam, had come into existence. Under Siamese suzerainty, Lan Na kingdom was divided into five smaller principalities, namely the Chiang Mai, Nan, Lampang, Lamphun, and Phrae. Lan Na ceased to be an entity on its own after it was incorporated into modern Kingdom of Siam.

Chiang Mai, under Burma's rule, lasted more than 200 years, but there were some periods that switched to Ayutthaya rule.  The reign of King Narai the Great, and there were some independent periods, but was dominated and ruled by the Lao King called Ong Kham from the Kingdom of Luang Prabang for more than 30 years.

Lan Na language 

Kham Mueang or Phasa Mueang is the modern spoken form of the old Lan Na language. Kham Mueang means "language of the principalities" (Kham, language or word; mueang, town, principality, kingdom) as opposed to the languages of many hill tribe peoples in the surrounding mountainous areas. The language may be written in the old Lan Na script, which somewhat resembles that of the Thai, but differs significantly in spelling rules. Due to the influence of the latter, it also differs significantly from the modern pronunciation of Kham Mueang.

Historical writings on Lan Na
 The Chiang Mai chronicles — Probably started in the late 15th century and enlarged with every copying of the palm leaves manuscript.
Jinakālamāli — composed by Ratanapañña (16th century) an account of the early rise of Buddhism in Thailand and details on many historical events.
 Zinme Yazawin — Burmese chronicle of Zinme (Chiang Mai).

See also
List of rulers of Lan Na
Kingdom of Chiang Mai
Lan Na language

Notes

References

External links 

 
Former countries in Thai history
Indianized kingdoms
Chiang Mai
Chiang Mai province
History of Chiang Mai
13th century in Thailand
14th century in Thailand
15th century in Thailand
16th century in Thailand
17th century in Thailand
18th century in Siam
1292 establishments in Asia
1775 disestablishments in Asia
States and territories established in 1292
States and territories disestablished in 1775
13th-century establishments in Thailand
1770s disestablishments in Thailand
Former monarchies of Southeast Asia